Kim Ha-neul (born 1978) is a South Korean actress.

Kim Ha-neul may also refer to:
Kim Ha-neul (golfer) (born 1988), South Korean female golfer
Kim Ha-nul (figure skater) (born 2002), South Korean female figure skater
Kang Ha-neul (born Kim Ha-neul on 1990), South Korean actor